Cleophas Udoyi (date of birth unknown) is a Kenyan former first-class cricketer.

Udoyi made one appearance in first-class cricket for Kenya against the touring Pakistan Starlets at Nairobi in 1986. Opening the batting twice in the match, he ended the Kenyan first innings of 243 all out unbeaten on 23 at number eleven, while in their second innings he was dismissed for a single run from the same batting position by Sajjad Akbar. With the ball, he bowled a total of 14 wicketless overs across the match, conceding 69 runs.

References

External links

Living people
Kenyan cricketers
Year of birth missing (living people)